Asura diluta is a moth of the family Erebidae. It is found in China.

References

diluta
Moths described in 1926
Moths of Asia